Clyde is an unincorporated community in Darlington County, South Carolina, United States. It is elevated at 233 feet and appears on the Lake Robinson Geological Survey Map.

References

Unincorporated communities in Darlington County, South Carolina
Unincorporated communities in South Carolina